Trevor Keogh (born 26 July 1949) is a former Australian rules footballer who played for Carlton in the Victorian Football League.

Keogh was recruited from Sandhurst in the Bendigo Football League and made his debut for Carlton in 1970. A rover, he has been described as "instrumental" in Carlton's premiership wins of 1972 and 1979. He won the club's Best and Fairest award in 1976 and 1978, also representing Victoria in the interstate competition in the same years. He averaged almost a goal a game in his long career, and was a member of Carlton's famous so-called "mosquito fleet" of small players who played a key role in Carlton's two premiership wins from 1972 to 1979.

Keogh retired from senior football in 1981, later coaching the Blues' under-19 team and becoming a runner for the senior team.

Keogh was named on the bench in Carlton's Team of the Century

References
 Trevor Keogh at Blueseum

1949 births
Living people
Carlton Football Club players
Carlton Football Club Premiership players
John Nicholls Medal winners
Sandhurst Football Club players
Australian rules footballers from Victoria (Australia)
Two-time VFL/AFL Premiership players